Satterlyite is a hydroxyl bearing iron phosphate mineral. The mineral can be found in phosphatic shales and was first discovered in the Big Fish River area in Yukon Territory, Canada.

Satterlyite is part of the phosphate mineral group. Satterlyite is a transparent, light brown to light yellow mineral with a density of 3.68 g/cm3. The structure of satterlyite is made up of two pairs of face shared, distorted  octahedra, linked together by sharing edges to form double chains along the [001] plain.

The first satterlyite mineral was discovered in the Big Fish River area in Yukon Territory, westernmost of Canada; by a geologist at Ontario Department of Mines in Canada, Jack Satterly, and the mineral was also named after him (Kolitsch, 2002).

Composition

Studies using the optical absorption spectra show that satterlyite has similar features to different iron bearing minerals with Fe(III) and Fe(II) impurities. Electron paramagnetic resonance studies were also made on the mineral first by turning the satterlyite mineral fine powder then putting it into an electron paramagnetic resonance quartz tube for measurements. The results showed a strong line on g=2.0 and another line on g=8.0, thus also showing a presence of ferrous and ferric ions in satterlyite.

Structure

Satterlyite is hydroxyl bearing iron phosphate with a space group P31m. The structure of satterlyite is made up of two pairs of face shared, distorted  octahedra, the two faces are linked together by sharing edges to form double chains along the [001] plain. The double chains share ligands with six other double chains to make a 3D network holding three  tetrahedra, linked by the corners to the  octahedra (Kolitsch, 2002). The two  oOctahedra have different occupancies; the Fe to Mg ratio of the M sites are 0.838(2):0.162(2) for the M(1) site and 0.706(2):0.294(2) for the M(2) site (Kolitsch, 2002).  The structure contains three H atoms; two are share ligands with two  octahedra and the third strongly disordered H atom is bonded to O of the  tetrahedron (Kolitsch, 2002).

Holtedahlite, a mineral that was found in Tingelstadtjern quarry in Norway, with the formula  is isostructural with satterlyite (Raade, 1979). Infrared absorption powder spectra show that satterlyite is different from natural haltedahlite in that there is no carbonate for phosphate substitution (Kolitsch, 2002).

Electron paramagnetic resonance and optical absorption studies have investigated the iron phosphate mineral satterlyite and gormanite. Results of the optical studies show that both minerals have ferrous and ferric ions (Chandrasekhar, 2003). These studies also show that the site symmetry of Fe(III) in satterlyite is tetragonally distorted. However, the Fe(II) ions is tetragonally distorted octahedral (Chandrasekhar, 2003). The complex structure of satterlyite is made up of two pairs of face shared, distorted  octahedra, linked together by sharing edges to form double chains along [001].

Physical properties

Satterlyite has a light brown to light yellow color with a light yellow streak and a hardness of 4.5 to 5. It has no trigonal (ditrigonal pyramidal) crystal symmetry with a space group P3*1m and no cleavage (Mandarino, 1978). The parameters of the mineral are a=11.35 Å and c=5.04 Å and the ratio of a to c is 1:0.444 and a cell volume 562.28 Å3 (Mindat, 2011). The mineral is found as one of three habits; aggregated (when the mineral is made up of many individual crystals or clusters), nodular (grows as a circle around the center) or radial (the crystal radiates outwards from the center of a common point on the mineral) (Mineralogy Database, 2011).

Geologic occurrence

Jack Satterly, a geologist at Ontario Department of Mines in Canada, discovered satterlyite in nodules in shale in the Big Fish River (Mandarino, 1978). These nodules were about 10 cm in diameter, some would consist of satterlyite only and others would show satterlyite with quartz, pyrite, wolfeite or maricite. The Commission on New Minerals and Mineral Names approved the name of the mineral (Mandarino, 1978). The type specimen is now preserved at the Royal Ontario Museum (Mandarino, 1978).

References 

Chandrasekhar A.V., Venkata Ramanaiah M, Reddy B.J., Reddy Y.P., Rao P.S., R.V.S.S.N. Ravikumar (2003) Spectrochimica Act Part A: Molecular and 	Biomolecular Spectroscopy; Issue 9, Volume 59, 2115–2121
Comments on the Calculation of the Density of Minerals; June, August 1981; Volume 19; p. 531–534
Kolitsch U., Andrut M. and Giester G. (2002): The crystal structure and infrared spectra of satterlyite. Eur. J. Mineral. 14, 127–133 
Mandarino, J.A., Sturman B.D., and Corlett M.I.. (1978) Satterlyite, a new hydroxyl-bearing ferrous phosphate from the Big Fish River area, Yukon 	Territory. Can. Mineral.,16, 411–413
Palache, C., H. Berman, and C. Frondel (1951) Dana's system of mineralogy, (7th edition), v. II, 727–72
Raade, G. and M.H. Mladeck (1979) Holtedahlite, a new magnesium phosphate from 	Modum, Norway. Lithos, 12, 283–28
The Canadian Mineralogist: Journal of the Mineralogical Association of Canada; June, August 1981; Volume 19; Part 3; p. 373–376
Wicksite, A New Mineral From Northeast Yukon Territory; June, August 1981; Volume 	19; p. 377–380
USGS, Phosphate Rock: Statistics and Information

External links

Phosphate minerals
Trigonal minerals
Minerals in space group 149
Minerals in space group 157
Minerals in space group 162